Angustopila psammion is a species of land snail belonging to the subfamily Hypselostomatinae  of the family Gastrocoptidae . It was described in 2022. 

This species was discovered by scientists scrutinising a small pothole-like cave located in northern Vietnam, according to the original description published in Contributions to Zoology. According to National Geographic, this is the smallest species of snail ever found. This species' shell measures 0.6 millimeters in diameter.

Etymology 
"Psammion (ψαμμιών)" derives from the ancient Greek word for "grain of sand."

References 

Gastrocoptidae
Gastropods described in 2022
Invertebrates of Vietnam
Cave snails